The Webhannet River is an  river whose  watershed is contained entirely within the town of Wells, Maine.

The river has five tributaries, including three with official names: Pope’s Creek, Depot Brook, and Blacksmith Brook. Draining a sandy outwash plain left by the last glacier, they run parallel to the southern Maine coastline behind the heavily developed barrier beaches of Wells and Drakes Island. The river flows into Wells Harbor, then empties between a pair of jetties into the Gulf of Maine.

The Webhannet watershed includes  of land under conservation, including  of estuary salt marsh and uplands protected by the Rachel Carson National Wildlife Refuge.

Jetties
In 1961-62, the U.S. Army Corps of Engineers built two rubble-mound jetties to protect the  channel to Wells Harbor. A 1-ft-thick bedding layer and core of 3-in. to  stone was covered with a double layer of stones weighing a minimum of two tons on the landward section and three tons on the seaward sections, for a total of 20,000 tons of stone. The cost for placing the stone was $95,600.

In 1962-63, the north jetty was extended  seaward at a cost of $29,300.

The work required a total of 119,000 tons of stone and cost $594,600 ($ today).

References

External links
 Wells National Estuarine Research Reserve
 Map of Webhannet River estuary
 U.S. Army Corps of Engineers description and drawing of Wells Harbor and its jetties, January 1989, pp. 31-32

Wells, Maine
Rivers of Maine
Rivers of York County, Maine